Vodrey is a surname. Notable people with the surname include:

Frederick Vodrey (1845–1897), English potter
Jabez Vodrey (1795–1861), English potter
Rosemary Vodrey, Canadian politician

See also
Will Vodery (1885–1951), American composer and conductor